Ski jumping competitions at the FIS Nordic World Ski Championships took place on 19 – 29 February 2015 in Falun, Sweden.

All competitions were held at the Lugnet ski jumping hills. It was the third time, five competitions were held during the Championships (together with 2011 and 2013). There were three individual competitions (one for men and one for women at the normal hill HS100 and one for men at the large hill HS134) and two team competitions (men at the large hill and mixed at the normal hill).

Champion's titles were defended by: Anders Bardal (the individual men competition, normal hill), Kamil Stoch (the individual men competition, large hill), Sarah Hendrickson (the individual women competition, normal hill), team Austria (the team men competition, large hill) and team Japan (the mixed team competition, normal hill).

The ski jumping hills 
Three competitions were held at the normal hill and the other two – at the large hill.

Jury 
The FIS Chiefs of the Competitions were: Chika Yoshida and Walter Hofer. Yoshida's assistant was Borek Sedlák and Hofer's – Miran Tepeš.

Medals

Men

Individual competition, HS100 (21.02.2015)

Individual competition, HS134 (26.02.2015)

Team competition, HS134 (28.02.2015)

Women

Individual competition, HS100 (20.02.2015)

Mixed competition

Mixed team competition, HS100 (22.02.2015)

Medal count

Wyniki

Women

Individual competition, HS100 (20.02.2015)

Men

Individual competition, HS100 (21.02.2015)

Individual competition, HS134 (26.02.2015)

Team competition, HS134 (28.02.2015)

Mixed competition

Mixed team competition, HS100 (22.02.2015)

References

FIS Nordic World Ski Championships 2015
2015 in ski jumping
Ski jumping competitions in Sweden